Rabiah Hutchinson (born Robyn Mary Hutchinson in August 1953) is an Australian Muslim and thought to be a key figure in the development of militant Sunni Islam in Australia. Hutchinson married a number of times including to members of Al Qaeda and Jemaah Islamiah and became the subject of an investigation by Australian Security Intelligence Organisation. Hutchinson traveled to the Mujaheddin camps in Afghanistan and into Osama bin Laden's inner circle and is believed to have been schooled there by the Mujaheddin. Rabiyah Hutchinson has been called the "matriarch" of radical Islam in Australia.

Early life
Hutchinson is of Scottish ancestry was born in August 1953 in Mudgee to a Sydney Presbyterian family; she later become a Baptist and then converted to Catholicism, eventually, Hutchinson converted to Sunni Islam.

Career
Hutchinson was linked with radical Indonesian clerics in the 1980s. She worked as a doctor for members of the mujahideen on the Pakistan-Afghanistan border in the 1990s. In Pakistan, she initially settled in the town of Pabbi, where a growing number of Afghan refugees affected by the war and foreign volunteers were pouring in. The only other Australian she knew in Pabbi was her friend Aisha, an Aboriginal convert whose husband had organised Rabiah's arrival in Pakistan, and who would bring Rabiah a jar of Vegemite when visiting. While living in Kabul, Afghanistan, Hutchinson met her third husband, Egyptian Mustafa Hamid (Abu Walid al-Masri). In Kabul, Hutchinson was regarded for her medical knowledge.

ASIO investigation
ASIO's assessment states that Ms. Hutchinson "has directly supported extremist activities" and, if allowed to travel, is "likely to engage in conduct that might prejudice the security of Australia or a foreign country".

Rabiah Hutchinson and her daughter Rahmah Wisudo were placed on a "no-fly list" due to alleged links to radical Yemeni cleric Anwar al-Aulaqi, who had ties to an offshoot of the al-Qaeda terrorist group .

Rabiah maintains she was labeled as an al-Qaeda operative because the authorities wanted "someone to blame".

In the media

Jihad Sheilas
Rabiah Hutchinson was one of the women featured in a documentary Jihad Sheilas aired on ABC television.

Family
As of December 2006, Hutchinson had been married eight times. She has been married to both Abdul Rahim Ayub and Abu Walid al-Masri. Two of her sons were arrested in Yemen, and were alleged to be linked to Jack Roche. Her daughter is married to Khaled Cheikho.

References

1953 births
Australian Muslims
Terrorism in Australia
Living people
Converts to Islam from Christianity
Former Presbyterians
Former Baptists
Former Roman Catholics
Australian expatriates in Afghanistan
Australian expatriates in Pakistan
Australian former Christians
Australian people of Scottish descent
People from Mudgee